Trangie is a  town in the Orana region of New South Wales, Australia. It is part of Narromine Shire local government area.
Trangie is on the Main Western railway line, New South Wales

Economy
The Trangie Research Centre is "one of the largest broadacre agricultural research centres in Australia".

Population
According to the 2016 census of Population, there were 1,188 people in Trangie.
 Aboriginal and Torres Strait Islander people made up 21.9% of the population. 
 83.9% of people were born in Australia and 89.4% of people spoke only English at home. 
 The most common responses for religion were Catholic 28.0%, Anglican 27.8% and no religion 16.0%.

Climate

Sport 
Trangie Magpies formerly played in the Castlereagh Cup rugby league competition.
Tennis player Lesley Turner Bowrey was born here in 1942, as well as rugby league player Justin Carney.

References

External links 

Photos of headstones in Trangie General Cemetery
Trangie local Website Trangie NSW

Towns in New South Wales
Populated places in New South Wales
Localities in New South Wales
Geography of New South Wales